Marcos Giron and Dennis Novikov were the defending champions but only Novikov chose to defend his title, partnering Gonçalo Oliveira.

Novikov successfully defended his title after defeating Luis David Martínez and Miguel Ángel Reyes-Varela 6–3, 6–4 in the final.

Seeds

Draw

References

External links
 Main draw

RBC Tennis Championships of Dallas - Doubles
2020 Doubles